The 2018 United Kingdom Championship Tournament was a two-day professional wrestling streaming event and tournament promoted by the American promotion WWE. The tournament aired exclusively on the WWE Network and featured wrestlers from the NXT UK and NXT brand divisions—the first event to officially promote NXT UK. The event was filmed on 18 and 19 June 2018 and aired on tape delay on 25 and 26 June. It was held at the Royal Albert Hall in Kensington, London, England.

Day one of the event featured the second United Kingdom Championship Tournament, which was won by Zack Gibson. Day two (promoted as NXT U.K. Championship) saw Zack Gibson unsuccessfully challenge WWE United Kingdom Champion Pete Dunne. NXT's North American, Women's, and Tag Team championships were also defended on day two. NXT UK's Women's and Tag Team championships were introduced during the event.

Background

Production
On 14 and 15 January 2017, the American professional wrestling promotion WWE held its first United Kingdom Championship Tournament event. The tournament crowned the inaugural holder of the WWE United Kingdom Championship, which was won by Tyler Bate. A follow-up to the event called the United Kingdom Championship Special aired on May 19. On 7 April 2018, a second United Kingdom Championship Tournament event was scheduled for 18 and 19 June at the Royal Albert Hall in Kensington, London, England and to air on 25 and 26 June exclusively on the WWE Network. In addition to featuring wrestlers from WWE's new NXT UK brand, the tournament also featured wrestlers from the American-based NXT.

On 25 May 2018, Shawn Michaels and Triple H were scheduled to make appearances at the event. On 7 June, Johnny Saint was announced as the General Manager of WWE's United Kingdom-based brand, officially named NXT UK. A United Kingdom Championship Tournament: Bracketology special aired on the WWE Network later that day, with appearances from all 16 tournament competitors.

Storylines
The card included matches that resulted from scripted storylines, where wrestlers portrayed villains, heroes, or less distinguishable characters in scripted events that built tension and culminated in a wrestling match or series of matches, with results predetermined by WWE's writers. Storylines were produced on the NXT television program.

On 28 April 2018, it was announced that British Strong Style (Pete Dunne, Trent Seven and Tyler Bate) would face The Undisputed Era (Adam Cole, Kyle O'Reilly and Roderick Strong) in a six-man tag team match on the June 18 event.

On 14 May, WWE revealed details about the second United Kingdom Championship tournament, scheduling the first round matches for the 2018 Download Festival from 8–10 June and succeeding rounds for the United Kingdom Championship Tournament event on 18 June. The winner of the tournament will receive a United Kingdom Championship match with Pete Dunne on the following day. On 16 May, the first 8 competitors of the 16 man tournament were officially announced on WWE.com. The first 8 revealed were Zack Gibson, Joe Coffey, Gentleman Jack Gallagher, Dave Mastiff, Kenny Williams, Ligero, Joseph Conners and Amir Jordan. On 18 May, the remaining 8 competitors were announced.

On 23 May, it was announced that Aleister Black and Ricochet would face EC3 and Velveteen Dream in a tag team match on the 19 June event.

On 25 May, a fatal four-way match between Isla Dawn, Jinny, Killer Kelly and Toni Storm was announced for the 18 June event. The winner of the match will receive a NXT Women's Championship match with Shayna Baszler on the following day.

On 18 June, it was announced that Adam Cole would defend his NXT North American Championship against Wolfgang the following day.

On 18 June, it was announced that The Undisputed Era (Kyle O'Reilly and Roderick Strong) would defend their NXT Tag Team Championship against Moustache Mountain (Tyler Bate and Trent Seven) the following day.

Participants

Tournament bracket

Results

United Kingdom Championship Tournament (18 June)

NXT U.K. Championship (19 June)

Broadcast team

Aftermath
On 18 June at day one of the event, it was revealed that WWE's United Kingdom brand would be debuting its first  television programme, called NXT UK. The inaugural tapings of NXT UK occurred on 28 and 29 July at the Cambridge Corn Exchange.

See also

Professional wrestling in the United Kingdom

References

External links 

2018 WWE Network events
January 2018 events in the United Kingdom
Events in London
2018 in London
2018
Tournament 2018
U.K. Championship
WWE international